Weybridge Ladies Amateur Rowing Club (WLARC) is a rowing club at the confluence of a mouth of the Wey and two weirstreams of the Thames, based at Boat House, Walton Lane, Weybridge, Elmbridge, Surrey.

Site and watersports reach
The site is owned by the club outright; its car park is time-of-stay, height- and width-restricted but public. For details of all the other well-established clubs on the reach see the list at Weybridge Rowing Club.

Colours
The colours of the club are, but for the red being lighter, the same as those of Walton Rowing Club – both resemble Oxford Brookes Boat Club which has white as the middle band.

History
The club was founded in 1926 and is affiliated to British Rowing. Amy Gentry founded the club at its Weybridge Point site six years after forming a thriving women's group at Weybridge Rowing Club.

The club has produced multiple British champions – such as in seven years, across many boat sizes, in the 1980s.

Honours

British champions

See also
Rowing on the River Thames

References

Sport in Surrey
Rowing clubs in England
Rowing clubs of the River Thames
1926 establishments in England
Sports clubs established in 1926